The 2019 World Beach Games were held in Doha, Qatar, from 12 to 16 October 2019.

3x3 basketball

4x4 beach volleyball

Aquathlon

Beach handball

Beach soccer

Beach tennis

Beach wrestling

Karate

Open water swimming

Sailing

Skateboarding

Sport climbing

Water skiing

References

External links
 Official website

Medalists